This list of chiropractic schools is organized alphabetically by country. In those countries with functioning, specialized, accrediting agencies, the colleges holding "recognized", or "accredited" status are delineated. Other countries and regions are in the process of developing similar programs of accreditation; and, in Switzerland, chiropractic is so fully integrated into the health care system that the existence of a separate accrediting agency is thus obviated. The course is taught in university, on the same basis as human medicine.

In 2015, nine internationally accredited chiropractic colleges:  AECC, WIOC, IFEC-Paris, IFEC-Toulouse, SDU-Odense, UZ-Zurich, UJ-Johannesburg, Durbin University of Technology and Macquarie University, Australia, made an open statement which included: "The teaching of the vertebral subluxation complex as a vitalistic construct that claims that it is the cause of disease is unsupported by evidence.  Its inclusion in a modern chiropractic curriculum in anything other than an historic context is therefore inappropriate and unnecessary".

This document is based upon the World Federation of Chiropractic Educational Statement formulated in November 2014 at the Miami Education Conference.

Schools

See also
 Chiropractic education
 Council on Chiropractic Education
 Councils on Chiropractic Education International
 World Federation of Chiropractic

References

External links
 Association of Chiropractic Colleges
 List of Chiropractic Colleges (October 28, 2009)
 The Guide To Choosing a Chiropractic School
 Chiropractic Educational Institutions

Chiropractic